Sudha Kheterpal (born 28 March 1982) is a British-Indian musician best known as the percussionist in Faithless. In 2008, she toured with The Return of the Spice Girls. She has also played with K-Klass, Kylie Minogue, Melanie Williams, Jo Roberts, Corduroy, Mark Morrison, Rae and Christian, Ian Brown, Talvin Singh, The Pussycat Dolls and Dido.

Discography
Anti-Freeze (solo album)

Films
2004 - Eleni's Olives
1997 - A Life Less Ordinary

References

External links
 Official websitel
 Sudha on Myspace
 Sudha on discogs.com
 Sudha Kheterpal's Interview on Free Press Journal
 Left Lion (Nottingham) article on Sudha
 Official Web site for Sudha Kheterpal's record label, Bish Bash Records

Living people
British percussionists
People educated at Nottingham Girls' High School
1982 births
British people of Indian descent